The Sciora Dafora (or Sciora di Fuori) is a mountain in the Bregaglia Range of the Alps, located south of Vicosoprano in the canton of Graubünden. It is the northernmost summit of the Sciora group.

References

External links
 Sciora Dafora on Hikr
 The Sciora group on Summitpost.org

Mountains of the Alps
Alpine three-thousanders
Mountains of Graubünden
Mountains of Switzerland
Bregaglia